William H. "Bill" Carlucci (born June 3, 1967, in Rye Brook, New York) is an American rower.

References

External links
 
 
 

1967 births
Living people
Rowers at the 1996 Summer Olympics
Olympic bronze medalists for the United States in rowing
American male rowers
People from Rye Brook, New York
World Rowing Championships medalists for the United States
Medalists at the 1996 Summer Olympics
Pan American Games medalists in rowing
Pan American Games gold medalists for the United States
Pan American Games silver medalists for the United States
Rowers at the 1995 Pan American Games
Rowers at the 1999 Pan American Games
Medalists at the 1995 Pan American Games
Medalists at the 1999 Pan American Games